The military ranks of Bahrain are the military insignia used by the Bahrain Defence Force.

Commissioned officer ranks
The rank insignia of commissioned officers.

Other ranks
The rank insignia of non-commissioned officers and enlisted personnel.

References

External links
 

Bahrain
Military of Bahrain
Bahrain